Scott Reed or Read may refer to:

 Scott Elgin Reed (1921–1994), United States federal judge
 Scott Reed (comics) (born 1970), American illustrator, comic book artist and author

See also
 Scott Reid (disambiguation)